Pherusa or Pherousa (Ancient Greek: Φέρουσά means 'the bringer') was the name of two female deities in Greek mythology:

 Pherusa, one of the 50 Nereids, marine-nymph daughters of the 'Old Man of the Sea' Nereus and the Oceanid Doris. Her name, a participle, means "she who carries."  She, along with her sister Dynamene, were associated with the power of great ocean swells. Pherousa and her other sisters appear to Thetis when she cries out in sympathy for the grief of Achilles at the slaying of his friend Patroclus.
 Pherusa, counted by some authors as one of the Horae, goddess of substance and farm estates.

Notes

References 

 Aken, Dr. A.R.A. van. (1961). Elseviers Mythologische Encyclopedie. Amsterdam: Elsevier.
 Apollodorus, The Library with an English Translation by Sir James George Frazer, F.B.A., F.R.S. in 2 Volumes, Cambridge, MA, Harvard University Press; London, William Heinemann Ltd. 1921. ISBN 0-674-99135-4. Online version at the Perseus Digital Library. Greek text available from the same website.
 Hyginus, Gaius Julius, Fabulae from The Myths of Hyginus translated and edited by Mary Grant. University of Kansas Publications in Humanistic Studies. Online version at the Topos Text Project.
 Hesiod, Theogony from The Homeric Hymns and Homerica with an English Translation by Hugh G. Evelyn-White, Cambridge, MA., Harvard University Press; London, William Heinemann Ltd. 1914. Online version at the Perseus Digital Library. Greek text available from the same website.
 Homer, The Iliad with an English Translation by A.T. Murray, Ph.D. in two volumes. Cambridge, MA., Harvard University Press; London, William Heinemann, Ltd. 1924. . Online version at the Perseus Digital Library.
 Homer, Homeri Opera in five volumes. Oxford, Oxford University Press. 1920. . Greek text available at the Perseus Digital Library.
 Kerényi, Carl, The Gods of the Greeks, Thames and Hudson, London, 1951.

Nereids
Children of Zeus
Harvest goddesses
Deities in the Iliad
Horae